John William Welton (December 9, 1929 - May 9, 2013) was a Canadian football player who played for the Montreal Alouettes, Ottawa Rough Riders and Toronto Argonauts. He played college football at Wake Forest University, Queen's University and Stanford University.

References

1929 births
2013 deaths